is a Japanese astronomer. He co-discovered periodic comet 72P/Denning–Fujikawa.

References 

21st-century Japanese astronomers
Living people
Year of birth missing (living people)
Place of birth missing (living people)